Indian Uzhavar Uzhaippalar Katchi (Indian Farmers and Toilers Party), is a political party in the Indian state,  Tamil Nadu which was founded by Vettavalam Manikandan.

Notes

Political parties in Tamil Nadu
Political parties with year of establishment missing